John Walter Heselton (March 17, 1900 – August 19, 1962) was a Republican member of the United States House of Representatives from January 3, 1945 until January 3, 1959. Heselton represented Massachusetts' first congressional district for seven consecutive terms.

Heselton was born in Gardiner, Maine, the son of George W. and Mary E. (née Stafford) Heselton. He joined the United States Army for World War I, but his October 1918 enlistment came shortly before the end of the war, and Heselton was discharged in December.  He graduated from Amherst College and Harvard Law School, and practiced law in Greenfield, Massachusetts. He married his wife, Libbie Sweet, a graduate of Simmons College, in 1931. Heselton was active in Deerfield town politics, and was president of the Massachusetts Selectmen's Association from 1935 to 1938. He was the district attorney of the northwestern district of Massachusetts from 1939 to 1944. In 1944 he was elected to Congress, and served until his retirement in 1959. Heselton voted in favor of the Civil Rights Act of 1957.

Heselton retired in Vero Beach, Florida, and died on August 19, 1962, after having considered a political comeback in Florida earlier that year. He is buried at Oak Grove Cemetery in Gardiner, Maine.

References

External links

1900 births
1962 deaths
Burials in Louisiana
People from Gardiner, Maine
Republican Party members of the United States House of Representatives from Massachusetts
20th-century American politicians
Amherst College alumni
Harvard Law School alumni